Heidi Hassenmüller is a German author who writes young adult literature. In 1989 she was awarded the Buxtehude Bull award for her book, Gute Nacht, Zuckerpüppchen.

Works 
 Jochen zieht nach Holland. Jugend und Volk, Wien 1985, .
 Linda beisst sich durch. Echter, Würzburg 1986, .
 Kinderwagen zu verschenken. HPP, Velp 1989, .
 Gute Nacht, Zuckerpüppchen. Bitter, Recklinghausen 1989, .
 Andrea, ein Star will ich werden. Bitter, Recklinghausen 1990, .
 Ein Sonntag im September. Bitter, Recklinghausen 1991, .
 Zuckerpüppchen – was danach geschah. Bitter, Recklinghausen 1992, .
 Ein Tabu wird abgebaut. Bitter, Recklinghausen 1993, .
 Désirée, zwei Brüder Schlaf und Tod. Bitter, Recklinghausen 1994, .
 Die Kehrseite der Medaille. Bitter, Recklinghausen 1995, .
 Momentaufnahmen einer Urlaubsreise. Bitter, Recklinghausen 1996, .
 Warten auf Michelle. Lübbe, Bergisch Gladbach 1996,  .
 Das verstummte Lachen. Lübbe, Bergisch Gladbach 1996, .
 Tango tanzt man nicht mit Tulpen. Lübbe, Bergisch Gladbach 1998, .
 Warum gerade mein Kind? Patmos, Düsseldorf 1998, .
 Gefährliche Freunde. Ellermann, Hamburg 1998, .
 Kein Beinbruch. Ellermann, Hamburg 1999, .
 Spiel ohne Gnade. Ellermann, Hamburg 1999, .
 Majas Macht. Ellermann, Hamburg 2001, .
 Schwarz, rot, tot. Klopp, Hamburg 2004, .
 Kein Engel weit und breit. Klopp, Hamburg 2005, .
 Schnauze voll. Klopp, Hamburg 2006, .
 Schrecklich Schön. Klopp, Hamburg 2007, .
 Superstar – Intrigen backstage. Klopp, Hamburg 2008, .
 Falsche Liebe. Klopp, Hamburg 2009, .
 Gegen meinen Willen. Klopp, Hamburg 2010, .

References

German children's writers
German women children's writers
Year of birth missing (living people)
Living people